

218001–218100 

|-id=097
| 218097 Maoxianxin ||  || Xianxin Mao (born 1980) of Suzhou, Jiangsu, was a classmate of T. Chen, who located this object in images from NEAT, at Suzhou Pingjiang Experimental Primary School. || 
|}

218101–218200 

|-bgcolor=#f2f2f2
| colspan=4 align=center | 
|}

218201–218300 

|-bgcolor=#f2f2f2
| colspan=4 align=center | 
|}

218301–218400 

|-id=400
| 218400 Marquardt ||  || Daniel Marquardt (born 1983), a writer and educator. || 
|}

218401–218500 

|-bgcolor=#f2f2f2
| colspan=4 align=center | 
|}

218501–218600 

|-bgcolor=#f2f2f2
| colspan=4 align=center | 
|}

218601–218700 

|-id=636
| 218636 Calabria ||  || Calabria is a southern Italian region. The region is at the tip of the Italian peninsula and is predominantly hilly. Between the 8th and 4th centuries BCE, Calabria was a thriving Greek colony. || 
|-id=679
| 218679 Sagamorehill ||  || Sagamore Hill (also known as the "Summer White House", located in Cove Neck, New York) was the home of former US President Theodore Roosevelt. Now a National Historic Site, Sagamore Hill was the location of the first negotiations in 1905 to end the Russo-Japanese War. || 
|-id=692
| 218692 Leesnyder ||  || LeRoy F. Snyder (born 1928) is an accomplished variable-star researcher, having published numerous papers in AAVSO and IAPPP journals. He was a cofounder of the IAPPP-Western Wing, now the Society for Astronomical Sciences, and has served as its president for many years. || 
|}

218701–218800 

|-id=752
| 218752 Tentlingen ||  || The Swiss municipality of Tentlingen in the canton of Fribourg, no far from the discovering Observatory Naef Épendes || 
|}

218801–218900 

|-id=866
| 218866 Alexantioch ||  || Alexandros of Antioch was a Greek sculptor of the 1st century BCE, known today for the Venus de Milo (Aphrodite of Milos), which is on display at the Louvre Museum in Paris, France. || 
|-id=900
| 218900 Gabybuchholz ||  || Gabriele Buchholz (née Schöpf, b. 1952), who provides medical care, from classical therapy to acupuncture, for the people of Nagold, in southern Germany. || 
|}

218901–219000 

|-
| 218901 Gerdbuchholz ||  || Gerhard Buchholz (born 1950) provides medical care, from classical therapy to acupuncture, for the people of Nagold, in southern Germany. || 
|-id=914
| 218914 Tangauchin ||  || Tang Aoqing (1915–2008),  was a Chinese theoretical chemist, widely known as "The Father of Quantum Chemistry in China". He was an academician of Chinese Academy of Sciences and a member of the International Academy of Quantum Molecular Science. (Alternative spellings of his name include Au-Chin Tang and Tang Au-chin.) || 
|-id=987
| 218987 Heidenhain ||  || Johannes Heidenhain (1898–1980), a German entrepreneur and amateur astronomer. || 
|-id=998
| 218998 Navi ||  || Navi Kocher (born 2009), grandchild of Swiss discoverer Peter Kocher || 
|}

References 

217001-218000